Loaded is the second studio album by Unit:187, released on August 26, 1997 by 21st Circuitry. Writing for the album was completed in December 1996 but the material wasn't recorded until February of the following year. In October 1997CMJ New Music Monthly listed the album at number one on their "Dance Top 25" chart.

Reception

Allmusic awarded Loaded three out of five possible stars. Aiding & Abetting commended the band for diversifying their sound, saying "change is good, and I think the pullback from the hardcore is the right one" and "there are still plenty of mean and loud moments, but now they have a context in which to work." Sonic Boom credited the band's change in membership and choice of Strapping Young Lad frontman Devin Townsend as a producer with providing "rich compositional arrangement, appropriate use of guitars, and strong production qualities that make UNIT:187 sound like a brand new band." Fabryka Music Magazine called Loaded "a successful trial of connecting metal riffs with modern electronics."

Track listing

Accolades

Personnel
Adapted from the Loaded liner notes.

Unit:187
 Tod Law – lead vocals, production and engineering (5, 6)
 John Morgan (as Gorgon) – programming, production (1-4, 7-12), and engineering (5, 6)
 Jed Simon – guitar, production and engineering (5, 6)
 Byron Stroud – bass guitar, production and engineering (5, 6)

Additional personnel
 Stephen Caccilin (as Tensor) – remixing and engineering (10)
 Rhys Fulber – remixing and engineering (12)
 Sid Meconse (as Tensor) – remixing and engineering (10)
 Eric Powell – remixing and engineering (11)

Production and design
 John Fyssas – mastering, editing
 Tim Oberthier – engineering, production (6)
 Nickie Senger – design
 Chris Sheldon – photography
 Devin Townsend – engineering, production (1-4, 7-12)

Release history

References

External links 
 Loaded at iTunes
 

1997 albums
Unit:187 albums
21st Circuitry albums
Off Beat (label) albums
Albums produced by Devin Townsend